Aleksandar Milenković (born March 14, 1994) is an Austrian/Serbian footballer who currently plays as a centre-back.

References

External links
 
 bundesliga.at profile 
 
 Aleksandar Milenković at ÖFB

1994 births
Living people
Austrian footballers
Footballers from Vienna
Association football defenders
Floridsdorfer AC players
2. Liga (Austria) players
FC Mauerwerk players